Omorgus punctatus is a beetle of the family Trogidae. It is found in the United States and Mexico.

References

punctatus
Insects of Mexico
Beetles of the United States
Beetles described in 1824
Taxa named by Ernst Friedrich Germar